Ahlam Bsharat (born in 1975 in Tamoun) is a Palestinian writer and poet, born in the village of Tammun in the Jordan Valley, and a trainer specialized in creative writing. She is an author of short stories, picture books, novels, and memoirs. Ahlam Bsharat is considered one of the most prominent names produced young people's literature and short stories in Palestine. She has written four novels for young people, dozens of children's stories, and two short story collections. Bsharat gained great attention after publishing the novel "My Kinetic Name is a Butterfly", a novel addressed to young people that reached the list of the 100 most important books for young people in the world in 2012, and the novel was reprinted in both Arabic and English. Bsharat's career as professional writer began in 2005, although she had this talent since the primary stage in her school. She composed stories and drew a visual narrative parallel to the text, so she acquired both skills at a young age.

Certifications and positions 
She completed her secondary education and then joined the Faculty of Arts at An-Najah National University, where she obtained a BA and MA in Arabic literature from the same university and worked as a teacher for twelve years, then rose to become the director of the Children's Literature Department in the Palestinian Ministry of Culture.

Early life and career 
Ahlam Bsharat was born and grew up in a family working in the cultivation of the land. She dreamed of becoming a fashion designer, painter, or farmer, but she became a writer, and this was not easy. She is still tormented and enjoys words, and weather conditions, such as fields, hills, and small valleys. The villages of Jiftlik and Tammun. Her family lived in Tammun while her school and the family farm were in Jiftlik. So, this daily trip painted the imaginations of the girl Ahlam, who lived her school life in parallel with her active role in agricultural life with the family of ten. She did not find good news in the reality of her childhood as entertainment. Her imagination is a haven, which she translated into writings and drawings in expression classes in the sixth grade. It was her first attempt to write a story that coincided with the beginning of the first intifada and reflects the girl's ideas about the events in her surroundings. She began her career in writing for young people in addition to writing fiction and poetry, since "My Kinetic Name is a Butterfly" (2009), through "Trees for Absentee People" (2013) and "Ginger" (2017) until "The Memories Factory". Ahlam establishes a writing that starts from Palestine, from her questions and reality, to reach her question sometimes to a different picture of reality to embrace it again.

Books

Resources 

21st-century Palestinian women writers
1975 births
Living people
21st-century Arabic writers